Cistus grancanariae is a shrubby species of flowering plant in the family Cistaceae. It was described for the first time in 2008. It is endemic to a small area in the north of the island of Gran Canaria.

Description
The upper sides of the leaves are covered with short stellate (star-shaped) hairs and long simple hairs, some glandular. The undersides of the leaves are whitish and more densely covered with hairs. The flowers are arranged in cymes, with 3–25 flowers to each inflorescence.

Taxonomy
Cistus grancanariae was first described in 2008 by Águedo Marrero, Rafael Almeida and Carlos Ríos. One of the group of white-flowered species of Cistus, it was previously mistaken for Cistus monspeliensis, common in Gran Canaria. The leaves of the two species are different: C. monspeliensis has narrower leaves, more rolled under at the edges (more revolute), with upper surfaces that are green, sticky (viscous), and without stellate hairs.

Distribution and habitat
There are two main populations (Cabo Verde–Los Toscales and the Montaña de Guía) and three that are more fragmented. Plants are found in areas affected by human activity, such as deforestation, cultivation and grazing. The region is influenced by moist Atlantic winds, and has a Mediterranean-type climate, generally somewhat arid or with only seasonal rainfall, totalling  a year.

Conservation
Cistus grancanariae grows only in a limited area. Two of its locations are within protected areas, but these contain few individuals. Most of its range is unprotected and subject to human disturbance. In view of these factors, Marrero et al. consider that the species is eligible for vulnerable (VU) status under the IUCN Red List criteria.

References

External links
; includes distribution map
; includes photographs

grancanariae
Plants described in 2008
Flora of the Canary Islands